Ante Krapić (born December 19, 1985) is a Croatian professional basketball player  currently playing for Bosco of the Croatian second-tier Prva muška liga. Standing at 2.03 m, he plays at the forward positions.

External links
 scoutbasketball.com Profile
 Druga ABA Liga Profile
 proballers.com Profile
 realGM Profile

References

1985 births
Living people
Croatian men's basketball players
KK Cibona players
KK Zadar players
KK Zagreb players
Basketball players from Zadar
BC Lietkabelis players
KK Zabok players
Forwards (basketball)
Power forwards (basketball)
CSU Pitești players
ZTE KK players
SZTE-Szedeák players
KK Gorica players

Sportspeople from Zadar
KK Borik Puntamika players